Qeshlaq-e Khalillu or Qeshlaq-e Khalilu may refer to:
 Qeshlaq-e Khalillu Aziz
 Qeshlaq-e Khalillu Gholam
 Qeshlaq-e Khalilu Heydar